Monisha Rajesh (born 1982) is a British journalist and travel writer.

Early life
Rajesh was born in Norfolk, England, the child of two Indian doctors. The family moved from Sheffield to Madras, India, in 1991. After two years, "fed up with soap eating rats, stolen human hearts and [the] creepy colonel across the road, we returned to England with a bitter taste in our mouths", and she made only occasional visits to India over the next twenty years: "little more than the occasional family wedding had succeeded in tempting me back". She attended King Edward VI High School for Girls in Birmingham, the University of Leeds, and has a postgraduate diploma in magazine journalism from the Department of Journalism, City University.

Career
Rajesh has worked for The Week and written for The Guardian,  The Times, The New York Times and Time.

In 2010, she embarked on a four-month journey around India by train, using 80 train journeys to reach the furthest points of the Indian rail network, described in her 2012 book Around India in 80 trains.

She subsequently travelled around the world in another 80 train journeys, writing Around the World in 80 Trains (2019), which The Independent listed in 2020 as one of "10 best travel books to satisfy your wanderlust in lockdown".

In mid-2021 she, with Sunny Singh and Chimene Suleyman, received racist abuse on social media as a result of raising concerns about depictions of autism and of students of colour in Kate Clanchy's book Some Kids I Taught and What They Taught Me, with Rajesh characterising some of Clanchy's prose as "dehumanising", "racist", "anti-Black", "antisemitic" and "more like something a eugenicist might observe than a trusted teacher". The discussion prompted a reaction, including from authors such as Philip Pullman and Amanda Craig, that Rajesh characterised as racist, writing in The Guardian that "a sinister realisation dawned as they closed ranks and appeared to reply to white critics only", with "a group of white women authors pointedly demean[ing]" the women of colour "as 'activists' who were 'attacking' Clanchy". Rajesh also wrote that the 3 women of colour were "under a coordinated racist attack from the 'alt-right' which targeted our emails and social media".

Rajesh won the 2020 National Consumer Feature of the Year award of the Travel Media Awards for a piece in The Guardian about the Trans-Siberian Railway.

She was one of the judges for the 2021 Stanford Dolman Travel Book of the Year , after her Around the World in 80 Trains was shortlisted for the 2020 award.

Selected publications

References

External links
Around the world in 80 trains website

1982 births
Living people
British travel writers
British women travel writers
British journalists
British women journalists
Alumni of City, University of London
British writers of Indian descent